The Phantom of Manhattan is a 1999 novel by British writer Frederick Forsyth, written as a sequel to the 1910 novel Le Fantôme de l'Opéra by Gaston Leroux.

Forsyth's literary concept is that Leroux had recorded factual events but, in review, had apparently not checked his facts or viewed his sources with a critical eye. The novel can therefore be read as both a tribute to Leroux's novel, and also a satire of period novels.

The beginning of The Phantom of Manhattan is narrated by an ailing Madame Giry, and set in the early 1900s. Famous individuals of the time, such as Theodore Roosevelt, are mentioned in the novel.

The 2010 stage sequel to the 1986 musical The Phantom of the Opera, Love Never Dies, is based partly on The Phantom of Manhattan.

Characters
 Erik Muhlheim "The Phantom" - Former Phantom of the Paris Opera, now an important New York impresario.
 Christine Daaé, Vicomtesse De Chagny - A famous soprano, and the Phantom's main love interest. She is married to Raoul and has one son, Pierre.
 Raoul, Vicomte De Chagny - Christine's husband.
 Antoinette Giry - Former ballet mistress of the Paris Opera, rescued Erik from a circus when he was a child, and years later helped him come to the United States.
 Darius - Erik's partner.
 Pierre De Chagny - Young son of Christine and the Phantom. Assumes Raoul is his father, but doesn't know his biological father.
 Charles "Cholly" Bloom - New York American reporter who wants to discover the truth about the Phantom.
 Father Joseph "Joe" Kilfoyle - Irish Priest and Pierre's tutor, who is secretly attracted to Christine.
 Meg Giry - Madame Giry's daughter. She was a ballerina at the Paris Opera before a crash ended her career.
 Armand Dufour - Lawyer contracted by Madame Giry to carry the letter to Erik in New York.
 Taffy Jones - Coney Island's animator, accidentally hears a revealing conversation between Erik and Christine.

References  

1999 British novels
Novels by Frederick Forsyth
The Phantom of the Opera (1986 musical)
Fiction set in the 1900s
Sequel novels
Bantam Books books